Dwayne Alonzo "Pearl" Washington (January 6, 1964 – April 20, 2016) was an American professional basketball player.

Early life 
Washington grew up in the Brownsville section of the New York City borough of Brooklyn, where he acquired his nickname as an eight-year-old in a taunting comparison to Earl "the Pearl" Monroe. He was a playground phenomenon from Boys and Girls High School in Brooklyn, and was rated as the number one overall high school player in the United States in 1983.

College career 
Washington brought his flashy play to Syracuse University and the Carrier Dome. "The Pearl" was the master of the "shake and bake", in which he would leave his defensive opposition standing still while he drove by them for a layup. Utah Jazz point guard and NBA Hall of Famer John Stockton named Washington as the toughest player he ever had to guard.

Professional career

New Jersey Nets (1986-1988) 
Washington was drafted by the New Jersey Nets in the first round (13th pick) of the 1986 NBA draft. In two seasons with the Nets he averaged 9 points per game.

Miami Heat (1988-1989) 
In 1988 the Miami Heat selected Washington in their expansion draft. He played 54 games for the Heat before being released.

Rapid City Thrillers and San Jose Jammers (1989-1991) 
Following Washington's release from Miami, Washington played for the Rapid City Thrillers and San Jose Jammers in the Continental Basketball Association.

Personal life 
Washington had surgery on August 27, 2015, at Crouse Hospital in Syracuse to address a malignant brain tumor. He died on April 20, 2016, at the age of 52.

References

External links

 Syracuse Orange bio

1964 births
2016 deaths
African-American basketball players
All-American college men's basketball players
American men's basketball players
Basketball players from New York City
Deaths from brain cancer in the United States
McDonald's High School All-Americans
Miami Heat expansion draft picks
Miami Heat players
New Jersey Nets draft picks
New Jersey Nets players
Parade High School All-Americans (boys' basketball)
People from Brownsville, Brooklyn
Point guards
Rapid City Thrillers players
San Jose Jammers players
Sportspeople from Brooklyn
Syracuse Orange men's basketball players
20th-century African-American sportspeople
21st-century African-American people